P&P may refer to:

People & Planet, a UK student campaign network
Photochemistry and Photobiology, an academic journal
Picture-in-picture, a feature of some television receivers and similar devices
Postage and packaging, mail charges  
Pride and Prejudice, a novel by Jane Austen
Pride and Prejudice (disambiguation), film adaptations of the Austen novel of the same name
Principles and parameters
SMT placement equipment or pick-and-place machines, surface mount technology equipment
Powell and Pressburger, a film-making partnership
Paper and pencil game, board games and the likes played using pencils or pens
"P & P", a song by Kendrick Lamar from his 2009 extended play, Kendrick Lamar

See also 
 PNP (disambiguation)